The Temper Trap EP is the debut EP from the Australian indie rock band The Temper Trap. It was released on 18 November 2006 and was produced by Scott Horscroft. The song "Sirens" was featured on the EA video game Rugby 08.

Track listing

Members
Dougy Mandagi – lead vocals, keyboards
Toby Dundas – drums
Jonathon Aherne – bass, backing vocals
Lorenzo Sillitto – guitars, backing vocals

References

2006 debut EPs
The Temper Trap albums